Lindy Lee (born 1954) is an Australian painter and sculptor of Chinese heritage, whose work blends the cultures of Australia and her ancestral China and explores her Buddhist faith. She has exhibited widely, and is particularly known for her large works of public art, such as several iterations of The Life of Stars at various locations in China and on the forecourt of the Art Gallery of South Australia, and The Garden of Cloud and Stone in Sydney's Chinatown district.

Early life and education 
Lee was born in 1954 in Brisbane, Queensland, the daughter of Chinese immigrants who fled Guangdong province in China with their two older children after the rise of communism in that country. Her father arrived first, in 1949, and her mother and siblings, came afterwards, in 1953. Lee's experiences with racism as a child in Australia coupled with her experience of feeling alienated when visiting China because of her inability to speak in the Chinese language contributed to her interest in melding the cultures in her work.

She first qualified as a secondary school teacher at Kelvin Grove Teachers College in 1975. After encountering art galleries on a trip to Europe, she decided to pursue a career in art. She attended the Chelsea School of Art in London, after which she considered a career as an art teacher, but exposure to portraiture and contemporary art in London and elsewhere in Europe decided her to become a professional artist. During her years at graduate school at the Sydney College of the Arts in Australia she made her first portrait utilising photocopiers, a technique which featured prominently in her early work.

After decades as a practising artist, Lee attended the University of New South Wales, from which she achieved her PhD in Fine Art in 2001.

Themes and practice 

Initially denying her Chinese heritage and identity, she decided to embrace it and explore it in her art, initially using photos from the family album and creating two-dimensional artworks. Her later work blends the cultures of Australia and her ancestral China and explores her Buddhist faith.

Lee's work began in 1983 with a strong interest in originality and reproductions, utilising photocopiers to reproduce famous portraits over which she painted original work with acrylic paint after distorting the images. The resulting artworks raised questions about "originality and authenticity". Eventually, she began adding portraits of family and others before moving into other art forms, including sculpture. In 2008, during a residency in Kuala Lumpur, she began experimenting with first pierced paper, and then, with soldering irons and blow torches in a studio in Beijing, started burning holes in other materials, developing her distinctive "fire drawings".

As she became more involved in Zen Buddhism, she began to incorporate elements of religion in her work, which often focuses heavily on the theme of suffering. She also reflects Taoist themes, including the interconnectedness of the universe and of nature and humanity.

Works
Lee's most prominent public works include several iterations of The Life of Stars at various locations in China and in Adelaide, South Australia, and The Garden of Cloud and Stone in Sydney's Chinatown district.

The Life of Stars
In 2014, Lee was commissioned by Ting Hsin International Group in Shanghai to create a public art work, at which time she first started working with Urban Art Projects (UAP) in Brisbane, using bronze. After experimenting with a technique inspired by Buddhist spiritual practice which focused on oneness with nature, UAP collaborated with her to create the  mirror polished stainless steel, egg-shaped sculpture, The Life of Stars for the commission. The numerous piercings in the steel were arranged in overlapping concentric circles, representing "earth, life, birth and renewal" that is found in Tao and Buddhist principles, referring symbolically to the connectedness of the universe via a concept used in Mahayana Buddhism.

Several more versions of The Life of Stars now exist: in Shanghai; at the Province Midtown Cultural Centre in Zhengzhou (Life of Stars: Tenderness of Rain); and Xian, in China; as well as at the entrance to the Art Gallery of South Australia (AGSA) in Adelaide. The latter  sculpture was mounted on the AGSA forecourt after being presented for the 2018 Adelaide Biennial of Australian Art: Divided Worlds, its polished stainless steel surface reflecting its surroundings while simultaneously radiating light. Over 30,000 holes were individually placed by Lee resemble a map of our galaxy when lit from within. The sculpture was bought by the gallery as a farewell gift for departing director Nick Mitzevich in April 2018.

NGA ouroboros
In September 2021 the National Gallery of Australia (NGA) under director Nick Mitzevich commissioned an immersive  sculpture based on the ouroboros (an ancient symbol depicting a snake eating its own tail), to be placed near its main entrance of the gallery. Scheduled to be finished in 2024, at 14 million dollars the sculpture is the most expensive commission to date. The cost of the commission and some claims about it raised some controversy. John McDonald in The Sydney Morning Herald observed that the "breathtaking" sum of 14 million dollars for "another version of a successful formula" could have been used by the NGA to fill some significant gaps in its collection Christopher Allen from The Australian makes the same point and remarks on the work's 'immersive' quality that it merely "offer[s] a passive experience to audiences who are unwilling or unable to engage more actively with works of art."

Other roles
Lee was a founding member of Gallery 4A (now the 4A Centre for Contemporary Asian Art) in Sydney in 1996.

She was a senior lecturer at the Sydney College of the Arts (a faculty of the University of Sydney) for more than two decades, and has been a trustee at the Art Gallery of New South Wales.

She has served on the boards of Artspace Visual Arts Centre and the Australian Centre for Photography, and was president of the Asian Australian Artists Association as well as deputy chair of the Visual Arts and Crafts Fund of the Australia Council.

Recognition
Considered one of the foremost contemporary artists in the country, Lee has been commissioned to create several pieces of public art, such as Cloud Gate in Sydney's Chinatown district around 2013, consisting of cloud shapes made of brass inlaid into the footpath.

Lee is also widely known internationally, having exhibited in Canada, China, Hong Kong, Japan, Malaysia, New Zealand and Singapore.

In 2018 Lee, in collaboration with art fabricators Urban Art Projects (UAP), won an international competition run by the New York State Department of Transportation to build a public artwork in the heart of New York's Chinatown, beating around 80 other entries. They were used to mark nightfall and to summon the people for civic ceremonies and significant occasions, such as Chinese New Year. Following some objections to the design, later named The Dragon's Roar, the future of the sculpture was to be decided after community consultation in September 2019.

Tony Costa's oil painting of Lee won the Archibald Prize for portraiture in 2019. He said that he had been "attracted to her wisdom, humility, courage, humour and, above all, her deep focus regarding her art practice".

Elizabeth Ann Macgregor, curator of the Museum of Contemporary Art Australia (MCA), commented in 2021:

Exhibitions 
Lee started exhibiting her work in the 1980s. She has exhibited widely, with shows outside Australia in the United States, Germany, Canada, China, Hong Kong, Japan, Malaysia, New Zealand and Singapore.

Her work, along with that of two other Asian Australian artists, was featured in the inaugural exhibition of Gallery 4A (now the 4A Centre for Contemporary Asian Art) in 1997.

In 2014, the University of Queensland Art Museum mounted a survey of her work to date.

From 2 October 2020 until 28 February 2021, Lindy Lee: Moon in a Dew Drop, the largest ever solo exhibition of Lee's work, was mounted at the MCA in Sydney, curated by Elizabeth Ann Macgregor. The exhibition features more than 70 artworks, including a number of new works specially commissioned for the MCA. The exhibition then went on tour, starting with a stint at the Western Plains Cultural Centre in Dubbo, New South Wales, from 22 May to 1 August 2021, to be followed by the Lismore Regional Gallery in Lismore (NSW); Artspace Mackay (Queensland); Devonport Regional Gallery (Tasmania); and the John Curtin Gallery (Perth, WA), finishing on 24 July 2022.

References

External links

1954 births
Living people
Artists from Brisbane
21st-century Australian artists
Australian people of Chinese descent
Australian women artists
Alumni of the University of the Arts London
University of Sydney alumni
University of New South Wales College of Fine Arts alumni